Wes Kidd was a founding member of Rights of the Accused and Triple Fast Action, the latter signing to Capitol Records and Deep Elm Records. He grew up in Glen Ellyn, Illinois, and attended Glenbard West High School. After Triple Fast Action disbanded in 1998, he went on to produce several albums including Jimmy Eat World and tour with Local H as lead guitarist. He now manages the Damnwells, Old 97s, JD McPherson, Local H, and many others at Red Light Management.

References

Year of birth missing (living people)
Living people
Record producers from Illinois
People from Glen Ellyn, Illinois